Yang Ziyuan (April 1928 – 27 October 2018) was a Chinese politician who served as Mayor of Guangzhou, the capital of Guangdong Province, from 1988 to 1990.

Biography 
Yang was born in British Hong Kong in April 1928, with his ancestral home in Meizhou, Guangdong, China. During World War II, he sought refuge in Meizhou, and later in Sichuan Province, where he attended school. After the surrender of Japan, he went to Guangzhou in 1946 to attend Sun Yat-sen University, where he joined the underground Communist youth association.

After the founding of the People's Republic of China in 1949, he worked in the government of Guangzhou as well as Guangzhou Iron and Steel Company, and later became head of the Guangzhou Alloy Steel Factory. He was appointed Vice Mayor of Guangzhou in 1985, and promoted to Mayor in June 1988, when he was 60. He served as mayor for two years, and became Chairman of the Guangzhou CPPCC in 1991.

Yang died on 27 October 2018 in Guangzhou, at the age of 90.

References 

1928 births
2018 deaths
People's Republic of China politicians from Hong Kong
Mayors of Guangzhou
Sun Yat-sen University alumni